Ballystrudder or Ballystruder is a small village and townland (of 255 acres) on Islandmagee in County Antrim, Northern Ireland. It is situated in the historic barony of Belfast Lower and the civil parish of Islandmagee. It is part of Mid and East Antrim Borough Council. It had a population of 992 people in the 2011 Census.

References

See also
List of towns and villages in Northern Ireland
List of townlands in County Antrim

Villages in County Antrim
Civil parish of Island Magee